New York Pizza is a Russian pizza restaurant chain headquartered in Novosibirsk, Russia. It was founded in 1996. The company sells pizza, quesadilla, french fries, beer etc.

History
The company was founded in Novosibirsk by Russian-American entrepreneur Eric Shogren and his wife Olga. The first restaurant opened in Zheleznodorozhny District of Novosibirsk on Dimitrov Prospekt in 1996.

In 2015, New York Pizza opened the first restaurant in Moscow and the third restaurant in Barnaul.

Gallery

See also
 Kuzina

References

Further reading
 Siberian pizza chain shows way to Russia. Reuters.
 Pizza für Sibirien. Die Zeit.
 «В России всё меняется быстрее — это поразительно». НГС.НОВОСТИ.

Companies based in Novosibirsk
Fast-food chains of Russia
Restaurants established in 1996
Pizza chains